Everything Is Illuminated is a 2005 American biographical comedy-drama film, written and directed by Liev Schreiber and starring Elijah Wood and Eugene Hütz. It was adapted from the novel of the same name by Jonathan Safran Foer, and was the debut film of Liev Schreiber both as a director and as a screenwriter.

Plot

Jonathan Safran Foer, a young American Jew, goes on a quest to Ukraine to find the woman, Augustine, who saved his grandfather, Safran Foer, during the Holocaust in a small Ukrainian town called Trachimbrod that was wiped off the map when the Nazis liquidated Eastern European shtetls.

His guides, who drive up from Odessa to meet Jonathan as he arrives at the train station in Lviv, are a cranky, seemingly antisemitic grandfather, his wound-up dog named Sammy Davis Jr. Jr., and his enthusiastic grandson, Alex, who constantly chatters with a unique command of English and a passion for American pop culture that keeps the arduous journey lighter. These guides have been escorting wealthy Americans in search of their roots for decades. They are generally not very knowledgeable about the subject of finding Jews, and usually just attempt to scam them by taking them on long journeys. However, after hearing Jonathan's compelling story, they decide they actually want to help him.

Along the way in Volhynia, as they travel in search of the shtetl in the region around Lutsk, they have a series of misadventures, many of them humorous and based on the culture shock Jonathan experiences as an American tourist in Ukraine.

Traveling through much of rural western Ukraine, the three men eventually find Augustine's sister, Lista. She lives by herself in a house in the midst of a great sunflower field, isolated from technology and from news of the outside world. Lista tells them that Augustine was killed by Nazi soldiers after her father refused to spit on the Torah. And she leads them to the site where the town had been.

The next night Alex's grandfather quietly kills himself. Through flashbacks, it was revealed he was Jewish. During the massacre of the Jews of his town in the Holocaust, he was shot and thrown into a mass grave. But hours later, he regained consciousness and crawled out of the pit alive, and managed to survive the war himself by hiding his identity as a Jew. He abandoned this identity permanently, symbolically walking away from it.

Jonathan returns home to America after saying farewell to Alex, to whom he has grown close. They strike up a correspondence.

Both Jonathan and Alex sprinkle soil gathered from the site of the massacre on their respective grandfathers' graves. Alex's grandfather is given a Jewish tombstone.

Cast 

 Elijah Wood as Jonathan Safran Foer
 Boris Leskin as Grandfather
 Eugene Hütz as Alex
 Laryssa Lauret as Lista
 Jonathan Safran Foer as Leaf Blower

Music
The score for Everything Is Illuminated features eight original tracks composed by Paul Cantelon, along with songs by Russian ska punk band Leningrad, Arkady Severny, Csókolom, Tin Hat Trio, and Gogol Bordello, whose lead singer Eugene Hütz plays Alex. The band members of Gogol Bordello play the band in the train station where the character Alex has come to meet his US client, Jonathan Foer. DeVotchKa's single "How It Ends" is featured in the trailer, but not in the official soundtrack.

Critical response
American Chronicle counted the film among the "rare films that encapsulate the emotion of discovery and drama with humor", while Time Out New York called it Liev Schreiber's "unbelievably assured debut as a director". Roger Ebert praised the film, assigning it 3 and a half stars out of 4, and suggested that one might well see it a second time, as he did, "to understand the journey it takes".

Awards
 2005: Lanterna Magica Prize and Biografilm Award: Venice Film Festival: Liev Schreiber
 2005: Best Screenplay: São Paulo International Film Festival: Liev Schreiber
 2006: Best Actor: Pacific Meridian: Boris Leskin

References

External links

 
 
 
 
 
 

2005 films
2005 independent films
2000s road comedy-drama films
American road comedy-drama films
2005 black comedy films
2000s biographical films
American black comedy films
American biographical films
Films based on American novels
2000s Russian-language films
Ukrainian-language films
Big Beach (company) films
Warner Independent Pictures films
Films scored by Mark Orton
Films shot in the Czech Republic
Films about the aftermath of the Holocaust
Magic realism films
Films set in Ukraine
Ukraine in fiction
Films scored by Paul Cantelon
Jonathan Safran Foer
2005 directorial debut films
2005 comedy films
2000s English-language films
2005 multilingual films
American multilingual films
2000s American films